Kadiyapulanka is a locality in Rajamahendravaram City.

Economy
An important industry for Kadiyapulanka is horticulture, with the area's nurseries exporting flowers throughout India. Another is tourism. The place hosted the Eighth All-India Nurserymen's Convention.

References

Villages in East Godavari district